

The Apies River is a river that flows through the city of Pretoria, South Africa. Its source is located just south of the city (south of Erasmus Park) and it flows northward until it drains into the Pienaars River.

The word "Apies" is Afrikaans for small monkeys and is a reference to the historical abundance of vervet monkeys on the Apies River banks.

Nguni-speaking people, who became known as the Ndebele, are thought to have  been the first people to recognise the suitability of the Apies River valley as a place to put down roots.  The Ndebele encountered indigenous nomadic Khoisan people, which they called abaTshwa (the People who are Ignored), occupying the area. The Ndebele named the river 'Tshwane' which means 'Place of the abaTshwa'. It is also argued that they named the river after one of their chiefs "Tshwane" who is reputedly buried under the Wonderboom. It is also proposed that 'Tshwane' is a corruption of 'tshwene' which is the Sotho and Tswana word for monkey. However, the river is still recognized under its colonial name "Apies". The greater municipality of Pretoria is now known as Tshwane Metropolitan Municipality.  The river is - to a large extent - canalised with little resemblance of the natural river reach of the past.  The river reach between Wonderboom Poort and the Bon Accord Dam is, however, not canalised.

The Mamelodi township draws its name from the name of the river, with the full name being "Mamelodi ya Tshwane", meaning "Whistler of the Apies River", a nickname given to Paul Kruger.

Dams 
 Bon Accord Dam
 Leeukraal Dam

See also 

 List of rivers of South Africa
 List of reservoirs and dams in South Africa

References

External links
Overview of the Crocodile (West)/Marico Water Management Area 

Pretoria
Crocodile River (Limpopo)
Rivers of Gauteng